Theta Volantis, Latinized from θ Volantis, is a solitary star in the southern constellation of Volans. Based upon parallax measurements, is approximately 240 light years from the Sun. It has an apparent visual magnitude of 5.19, which is bright enough to be faintly visible to the naked eye.

Theta Volantis is an A-type main sequence star with a stellar classification of A0 V and a mass around 2.3 times that of the Sun. It is a young star with an estimated age of a few hundred million years, and is spinning rapidly with a projected rotational velocity of 98 km/s. Theta Volantis shines 37 times as brightly as the Sun, with an effective temperature of 8,753 K in its outer atmosphere.

The star has two optical companions: a magnitude 15.0 star at an angular separation of 22.10″ along a position angle of 58°, and a magnitude 10.64 star at an angular separation of 41.3″ along a position angle of 105° (both as of 2000).

References

A-type main-sequence stars
Volans (constellation)
Volantis, Theta
Durchmusterung objects
074405
042425
3460